Suchan may refer to:
 Suchan, a village in Sirsa District, Haryana, India
 A former name of Partizansk, Russia
 Suchan River, now Partizanskaya River, Russia
 Suchań, a town in Poland
 Sucháň, a village in Slovakia

See also